Riley Mants (born 25 October 1978) is a Canadian swimmer. She competed in the women's 200 metre breaststroke event at the 1996 Summer Olympics.

References

External links
 

1978 births
Living people
Canadian female swimmers
Olympic swimmers of Canada
Swimmers at the 1996 Summer Olympics
Swimmers from Winnipeg
20th-century Canadian women
21st-century Canadian women